The Bavarian State Library (abbreviated BSB, called Bibliotheca Regia Monacensis before  1919) in Munich is the central "Landesbibliothek", i. e. the state library of the Free State of Bavaria, the biggest universal and research library in Germany and one of Europe's most important universal libraries. With its collections currently comprising around 10.89 million books (as of 2019), it ranks among the best research libraries worldwide. Moreover, its historical stock encompasses one of the most important manuscript collections of the world, the largest collection of incunabula worldwide, as well as numerous further important special collections. Its collection of historical prints before 1850 number almost one million units.

The legal deposit law has been in force since 1663, regulating that two copies of every printed work published in Bavaria have to be submitted to the Bayerische Staatsbibliothek. This law is still applicable today. The Bayerische Staatsbibliothek furthermore is Europe's second-largest journals library (after the British Library). The BSB publishes the specialist journal Bibliotheksforum Bayern and has been publishing the Bibliotheksmagazin together with the Berlin State Library since 2007. Its building is situated in the Ludwigstrasse.

Tasks
 General and research library
 Central state and repository library of the Free State of Bavaria
 Collection of regional legal deposits and publications related to Bavaria
 Part of Germany's virtual national library in cooperation with the German National Library and the Berlin State Library
 Runs the Munich Digitization Center
 Responsibility for special subject collections of the German Research Foundation (Deutsche Forschungsgemeinschaft)
 Collaboration on the Corporate Body Authority File (Gemeinsame Körperschaftsdatei, GKD) and the Name Authority File (Personennamendatei, PND)

Use
In 2019, the library counted 78,600 active users and 1,173,000 loans. The reading rooms of the Bayerische Staatsbibliothek are used by around 4,000 readers every day. In the general reading room, open daily from 8 AM to 12 PM, approximately 111,000 volumes, primarily reference works, are freely accessible. In the periodicals reading room around 18,000 topical issues of current periodicals are available. The departments of manuscripts and early printed books, maps and images, music, as well as Eastern Europe, Orient and East Asia have their own reading rooms with open-access collections. Every day approximately 1,500 volumes are collected from the repositories and provided for use in the general reading room.
In 2010, a new research reading room was opened, focusing on Historical Sciences and Bavarian History and Culture (Aventinus Reading Room).

Inventory

 c. 33,921,166 media holding (including e-media)
 c. 10.89 million books
 c. 140,000 manuscripts; the catalogue is the work of librarian Johann Andreas Schmeller (1785–1852).
 Latin (Codices latini monacenses – Clm), c. 17,000 items.
Mulomedicina Chironis (Clm 243), 4th century
Breviarium Alarici (Clm 22501), 6th century
Purple Evangeliary (Clm 23631), 9th century
Codex Aureus of St. Emmeram (Clm 14000), c. 870
Computistic ms. of St. Emmeram (Clm 14456), early 9th century
Prayerbook of Otto III, c. 1000 (Clm 30111)
Evangeliary of Otto III (Clm 4453), c. 1000
Pericopes of Henry II (Clm 4452)
Sacramentary of Henry II (Clm 4456)
Uta Codex (Clm 13601), c. 1025
Ruodlieb romance fragments (Clm 19486), c. 1050
Scheyerer Matutinalbuch (Clm 17401)
Carmina Burana (Clm 4660)
prayer book of Maximilian I of Bavaria (Clm 23640)
the "Munich Manual of Demonic Magic" (Clm 849)
German (Codices germanici monacenses – Cgm), c. 10,500 items
 Manuscript A of the Nibelungenlied (Cgm 34); which was inscribed on UNESCO's Memory of the World Register in 2009 
 Freising manuscripts
Wessobrunn Prayer (Clm 22053)
Muspilli (Clm 14098)
Parzival by Wolfram von Eschenbach (Cgm 19)
Tristan by Gottfried von Strassburg (Cgm 51)
Greek (Codices graeci – Cod.graec.), 645 items
Slavic (Codices slavici, Cod.slav.), c. 100 items
the "Munich Serbian Psalter", after 1370 
Music manuscripts, c. 37,500 items
Illustrated manuscripts (Codices iconographici), c. 550 items
Fechtbuch of Paulus Hector Mair (Cod. icon. 393)
choir books by Orlando di Lasso (Mus. ms. A I+II)
Illuminated manuscripts from the Ottonian period produced in the monastery of Reichenau (Lake Constance), which were inscribed on UNESCO's Memory of the World Register in 2003
 54,400 current periodicals (print and electronic; Europe's second largest holding)
 21,000 incunabula (the world's largest holding) of around 9,660 different incunabula, among them
 a Gutenberg Bible
 c. 2,509,000 digitized volumes

Areas of emphasis
History, general
Pre-history and early history
Byzantium
Classical studies, incl. ancient history Medieval—and new Latin philology
History of Germany, Austria and Switzerland
History of France and Italy
Romania
Romanian language and literature
Albanian language and literature
Eastern-, eastern central and south-eastern Europe (in detail: Russia, Belarus, Ukraine, Moldova, Poland, the Czech Republic, Slovakia, Bulgaria, Slovenia, Croatia, Bosnia and Herzegovina, Serbia, Montenegro, Macedonia, Albania, Kosovo
Modern-age Greece (including language and literature)
Musicology
Information science, book studies and library science

Organisation

Directorate
Since 1 April 2015 Klaus Ceynowa is director general of the Bavarian State Library. The head office, the assistant to the directors, the office of corporate counsel, the information technology department and the public relations department are also part of the directorate.

Directors general:
 1882–1909 Georg von Laubmann
 1909–1929 
 1929–1935 Georg Reismüller
 1935–1945 Rudolf Buttmann
 1948–1966 
 1967–1972 
 1972–1992 
 1992–2004 
 2004–2014 Rolf Griebel
 2015–         Klaus Ceynowa

Main departments

Central Administration
The central administration is in charge of general administrative management; moreover, it acts as a service provider for all areas of the library. The department is responsible for the areas "budget", "human resources" and "internal services, construction".

Collection Development and Cataloguing
This department acquires all types of media (in the form or by way of presents, purchase, licensing, deposit copies and swapping items), and catalogues and indexes them both formally and according to subject. The Munich Digitisation Centre is a section of the department. It handles the digitisation and online publication of the cultural heritage preserved by the Bavarian State Library and by other institutions. It provides one of the largest and fastest growing digital collections in Germany. The department is also responsible for conservation and collection care. This division protects the media published from the year 1850 onward against damage and decay. It secures their long-term availability.

User Services
The user services department acts as an agent of the collections and services of the library. The department consists of the divisions of document provision, document administration, document delivery and information- and reading-room services.

Manuscripts and Early Printed Books
The department of manuscripts and early printed books is responsible for the most valuable historical collections of the library. The worldwide renown of the Bayerische Staatsbibliothek is founded on this precious heritage. The department has a separate reading room that is specially equipped for working with old books.

Special Departments

Map Collection and Image Archive
This department administrates printed maps from the year 1500 up to the present, atlases, cartographic material and the image archive of the Bayerische Staatsbibliothek. The image archive also includes parts of the archives of Heinrich Hoffmann, Bernhard Johannes and Felicitas Timpe. The Map Collection and Image Archive also have – together with the department of music – their own reading room.

Department of Music
The Department of Music ranks among the world's leading music libraries, due to both the quantity and quality of its historical collections and its broad acquisition profile. Its beginnings date back to the 16th century. The area of collection emphasis "musicology" of the German Research Foundation is overseen by this department. A special reading room for music, maps and images is provided for the library users.

Oriental and East Asia Department
The oriental collections of the Bayerische Staatsbibliothek comprise 260,000 volumes in Arabic, Armenian, Georgian, Hebrew, Yiddish, Mongolian, Persian, Tibetan and Indian languages. The East-Asian collections comprise more than 310,000 volumes in the Chinese, Japanese, Korean, Thai and Vietnamese languages. Users can avail themselves of the open-access collections in the east reading room occupied together with the department of Eastern Europe.

Department of Eastern Europe (Osteuropaabteilung)
The department of Eastern Europe is the largest special department of the Bayerische Staatsbibliothek, holding around one million books about and from Eastern Europe, from early modern times up to the 21st century. In addition to the eastern European area, it also addresses eastern central and south-eastern Europe as well as the Asian part of Russia. The open-access collection of the department is accommodated in the library's east reading room.

Departments in Charge of Predominantly Regional-Level Tasks
The departments in charge of tasks predominantly allocated to a regional level are the Bayerische Bibliotheksschule (Bavarian School of Library and Information Science), the Landesfachstelle für das öffentliche Bibliothekswesen (Consulting Centre for Public Libraries) as well as the head office of the Bavarian Library Network (Bibliotheksverbund Bayern).

State-Funded Bavarian Regional Libraries
The Bavarian regional state-funded libraries form part of Bavaria's academic library system. They are subordinated to the Bayerische Staatsbibliothek in the organisation structure. Among these libraries are the state libraries of Amberg, Ansbach, Neuburg an der Donau, Passau and Regensburg, the Studienbibliothek Dillingen, the Landesbibliothek Coburg, the Bamberg State Library as well as the Hofbibliothek Aschaffenburg.

History
The library was founded in 1558 as the court library of Duke Albrecht V, and was originally located in the vaulted chamber of the Alter Hof (old court) of the Munich residence. Initially, two book collections were acquired: on the one hand the personal papers of the Austrian jurist, orientalist and imperial chancellor Johann Albrecht Widmannstetter, consisting of oriental manuscripts and prints, editions of classic authors and works from the areas of theology, philosophy und jurisprudence, and on the other hand the collection of the Augsburg patrician Johann Jakob Fugger, which was acquired in 1571. Fugger had commissioned agents to collect volumes of manuscripts and printed works in Italy, Spain and the Netherlands. In the end the works collected in this way amounted to more than 10,000 volumes. At the same time, he had had manuscripts copied in Venice.

Apart from this, in 1552 Fugger had purchased the collection of manuscripts and incunabula of the physician and humanist Hartmann Schedel, representing one of the richest humanistic private libraries north of the Alps. The Fugger collection was first administrated and organised by the physician Samuel Quichelberg from Antwerp. He had adopted the shelving system of the Augsburg court library. Later the collection was administered by the librarian Wolfgang Prommer, who had catalogued the collection both alphabetically and according to keywords. Aegidius Oertel from Nuremberg became the first librarian in 1561. The main users of the library were the Jesuits, who had been invited to Munich in 1559.

William V continued the collection, making further purchases:
Spanish prints from the personal papers of the Tyrolean knight Anselm Stöckel (1583)
The collection of the Augsburg councillor Johann Heinrich Herwarth von Hohenberg comprising numerous music prints (1585)
Humanistic library of the canon of Augsburg and Eichstätt Johann Georg von Werdenstein (1592)
In 1600 the collection comprised 17,000 volumes.

The secularization of Bavaria and the transfer of the court library of the Electorate of the Palatinate around the year 1803 added approximately 550,000 volumes and 18,600 manuscripts to the library's holdings.

In 1827 Friedrich von Gärtner was commissioned to plan a representative building for the court- and state library. The original plan was to erect the building at Ludwigstrasse 1. In 1828 the plot opposite the Glyptothek on Königsplatz was chosen as location, but later in the same year the planners switched back again to Ludwigstrasse. The blueprints were completed in 1831. For lack of funds the laying of the foundation stone had to be postponed to 8 July 1832. The construction work on the building planned by Gärtner was concluded in 1843.

In 1919 the library received the name that it still bears today: Bayerische Staatsbibliothek.

During the Second World War more than 500,000 volumes were lost, although the collections were partly evacuated from the building. Some of the books were for example stored in the palace chapel of Schloss Haimhausen. Of the building itself 85% was destroyed. The reconstruction of the library building and the reintegration of evacuated holdings started in 1946. The books were destroyed on two occasions; the first time 400,000 items were lost including 140,000 theses, and the second time 100,000 unspecified items. Of the books that have been lost (about 380,000), a third or 118,800 have been recovered or repurchased to the present (2020).

1953–1966 the professors Hans Döllgast und Sep Ruf had to plan and realize the reconstruction of the eastern wing, a new area behind historic walls, and the extension building of the Bavarian State Library, a glass-steel frame construction for the bibliotheca. They made an available surface of 17.000 m² and a cubature of 84.000 m³. 1967 a jury with Hans Scharoun gave the price of the BDA Bayern to the extension building. The inauguration of the restored south wing of the building in 1970 marked the conclusion of the reconstruction work on the building.

The Speicherbibliothek Garching (book repository) was inaugurated in 1988.

The Bayerische Staatsbibliothek has also initiated large-scale internet projects. In 1997 the Munich Digitization Center took up work and the BSB started developing its web portals, including its own web site. The card catalogue 1841–1952 and the catalogue of incunabula 1450–1500 were converted, thus making the complete holdings of printed materials of the Bayerische Staatsbibliothek available online. The service "Digitisation on Demand", offered by a network of several European libraries, makes millions of books published between 1500 and 1900 available in digital form.

On 7 March 2007 Director General Rolf Griebel announced that Google Book Search will take over the digitisation of the copyright-free holdings of the Bayerische Staatsbibliothek. In 2008, the year of its 450th anniversary, the Deutscher Bibliotheksverband (German Library Association) awarded the title of Bibliothek des Jahres (Library of the year) to the BSB.

In 2012 an Italian scholar discovered among Johann Jakob Fugger's manuscripts in the library an 11th-century Greek codex containing 29 ancient homilies, previously unpublished, by the theologian Origen of Alexandria.

Restitution
Since 2003 the Bavarian State Library has gone to great efforts to restitute illegally-acquired library material. The most recent example is the restitution of the so-called Plock Pontifical to Poland in April 2015. It had been stolen by the Nazis from the Plock Bishopric in 1940 and was taken to Königsberg University. The Bavarian State Library bought the manuscript in 1973 for 6,200 DM at an auction in Munich. In the past years, the library has searched through those segments of its collections that are in question for illegitimate purchases. All in all, over 60,000 books have been meticulously checked so far. The library has identified around 500 books whose acquisition is to be regarded as unlawful. Subsequently, to these findings, several restitutions have taken place, amongst others the Bavarian State Library returned 78 volumes originating from Thomas Mann's research library to the Thomas Mann Archive in Zürich in 2007. Further restitutions are in preparation, for example 252 books from the former publishing house Geca Kon.

See also
State libraries of Germany
German National Library
Google Books Library Project
Virtual Library of Musicology
 Books in Germany

References

 Riding, Alan.  "France Detects a Cultural Threat in Google," New York Times. 11 April 2005.

External links

Website of the Bayerische Staatsbibliothek (in English)
Website of the Bayerische Staatsbibliothek (in German)
Website of the digital collections of the Bayerische Staatsbibliothek
Website of the Munich Digitization Center
hu-berlin.de – Lecture of Prof. Dr. Peter Zahn on the history of the Bayerische Staatsbibliothek (in German)
europeana
Website of bavarikon, the internet portal of the Free State of Bavaria for the presentation of art, culture and stocks of knowledge from Bavarian institutions.

 
Libraries in Munich
Buildings and structures in Munich
Historicist architecture in Munich
Deposit libraries
World Digital Library partners
Libraries established in 1558
1558 establishments in the Holy Roman Empire
16th-century establishments in Bavaria